Alicia Eggert  (born 1981) is an American artist known for her installations. Originally from Camden, New Jersey, she attended Drexel University and Alfred University. In 2018 she received the Hopper Prize. In 2019 she presented a TED Talk on her art. In 2021 she was commissioned by the Nasher Sculpture Center to create The Time for Becoming. It was installed in public space at 2000 Ross Avenue, Dallas, Texas. 

Eggert collaborated with Planned Parenthood to create OURs, a pink neon sign installed in front of the Supreme Court of the United States on January 22, 2022, the anniversary of the Roe vs. Wade ruling.

Her work, This Present Moment, was acquired by the Smithsonian American Art Museum as part of the Renwick Gallery's 50th Anniversary Campaign.

References

1981 births
Living people
21st-century American women artists
People from Camden, New Jersey
Artists from New Jersey
21st-century American artists
American women installation artists
American installation artists
Drexel University alumni
Alfred University alumni